Albert III (27 January 144312 September 1500) was a Duke of Saxony. He was nicknamed Albert the Bold or Albert the Courageous and founded the Albertine line of the House of Wettin.

Biography

Albert was born in Grimma as the third and youngest son (but fifth child in order of birth) of Frederick II the Gentle, Elector of Saxony, and Margarete of Austria, sister of Frederick III, Holy Roman Emperor. Later, he was a member of the Order of the Golden Fleece.

After escaping from the hands of Kunz von Kaufungen, who had abducted him together with his brother Ernest, he spent some time at the court of the emperor Frederick III in Vienna.

In Eger (Cheb) on 11 November 1464 Albert married Zdenka (Sidonie), daughter of George of Podebrady, King of Bohemia; but failed to obtain the Bohemian Crown on the death of George in 1471. After the death of his father in 1464, Albert and Ernest ruled their lands together, but in 1485 a division was made by the Treaty of Leipzig, and Albert received the Meissen, together with some adjoining districts, and founded the Albertine branch of the House of Wettin.

Regarded as a capable soldier by the emperor, Albert (in 1475) took a prominent part in the campaign against Charles the Bold, Duke of Burgundy, and in 1487 led an expedition against Matthias Corvinus, King of Hungary, which failed owing to lack of support on the part of the emperor.

In 1488 he was appointed Governor of the Netherlands (until 1493) and marched with the imperial forces to free the Roman king Maximilian from his imprisonment at Bruges, and when, in 1489, the King returned to Germany, Albert was left as his representative to prosecute the war against the rebels. He was successful in restoring the authority of Maximilian in Holland, Flanders, and Brabant, but failed to obtain any repayment of the large sums of money which he had spent in these campaigns.

His services were rewarded in 1498 when Maximilian bestowed upon him the title of Hereditary Governor (potestat) of Friesland, but he had to make good his claim by force of arms. He had to a great extent succeeded, and was paying a visit to Saxony, when he was recalled by news of a fresh rising. The duke recaptured Groningen, but soon afterwards he died at Emden. He was buried at Meissen.

Albert, who was a man of great strength and considerable skill in feats of arms, delighted in tournaments and knightly exercises.  His loyalty to the emperor Frederick, and the expenses incurred in this connection, aroused some irritation among his subjects, but his rule was a period of prosperity in Saxony.

Family and children
With his wife Sidonie, Albrecht had nine children:
 Katharina (Meissen, 24 July 1468Göttingen, 10 February 1524), married firstly on 24 February 1484 in Innsbruck to Duke Sigismund of Austria, and secondly on 1497 to Duke Eric I of Brunswick-Calenberg.
 Georg "der Bärtige" (Meissen, 27 August 1471Dresden, 17 April 1539).
 Heinrich V "der Fromme" (Dresden, 16 March 1473Dresden, 18 August 1541).
 Frederick (Torgau, 26 October 1473Rochlitz, 14 December 1510), Grand Master of the Teutonic Knights.
 Anna (Dresden, 3 August 1478Dresden, 1479).
 Stillborn child (1479).
 Louis (Torgau, 28 September 1481Torgau?, some days later / Torgau?, young after 1498) [?].
 John (born and died Torgau, 24 June 1484).
 John (Torgau, 2 December 1498Torgau?, some days later / Torgau?, young in September of the same year as his brother Louis) [?].

Ancestry

References

|-

|-

1443 births
1500 deaths
People from Grimma
Dukes of Saxony
Knights of the Golden Fleece
House of Wettin
Potestaats of Friesland
Saxon princes
Albertine branch